The Rastreador Brasileiro (in English, Brazilian Tracker) is a large breed of dog from Brazil, first recognised by the Fédération Cynologique Internationale in 1967, but an outbreak of disease, compounded by an overdose of insecticide, wiped out the breed's entire breeding stock.  The FCI and the Brazilian Kennel Club (Confederação Brasileira de Cinofilia) then declared the breed extinct in 1973 and delisted it. Since then, efforts have been made to re-create the breed. The Rastreador Brasileiro is a hunting dog of the scenthound type. The breed is also known by the names Urrador (for its hunting cry) or Urrador Americano, in reference to the American (U.S.) coonhounds in its background. In 2013, the Brazilian Kennel Club (CBKC) officially re-recognized the breed. The FCI Breed Standard was produced in 2019.

Appearance 
The Rastreador Brasileiro has a short, smooth coat. 
The colour options are:
 bluish colour: white background with blue spots/speckles; either with or without tan legs
 black and tan: black ground colour with tan markings 
 bicolour: white background with either brown or black spots
 tricolour: white background with black and brown markings/spots

The breed standard from 1970 shows the size as being 62 to 67 cm (24.4 to 26.4 ins) at the withers, and the general appearance as being generally similar to an American coonhound. However, the current official Brazilian breed standard mentions the height of males being 60 to 65 cm and the height of females being 56 to 63 cm.

Re-creation 
The Grupo de Apoio ao Resgate do Rastreador Brasileiro in Brazil, a club dedicated to the Brazilian restoration of the breed, lists as an objective the finding of 40 breeding animals of the correct type that can be certified as members of the breed, so as to eventually be once again recognised by the Brazilian Kennel Club.

Restoration of the breed is difficult due to the existence of very few dogs of the correct type and the lack of people interested in recovering the true Brazilian cultural and genetic heritage of the breed.

See also
 Dogs portal
 List of dog breeds
 Coonhound
 Foxhound
 Preservation breeding

References

External links 
 Photographs showing variations in type, from Foxhound to Coonhound

Dog breeds originating in Brazil
Scent hounds
FCI breeds